Kuoppala is a Finnish surname. Notable people with the surname include:

Alexander Kuoppala (born 1974), Finnish musician
Hanna Kuoppala (born 1975), Finnish ice hockey player
Jussi Kuoppala (born 1974), Finnish footballer
 

Finnish-language surnames